Gayane Chebotaryan (8 November 1918, Rostov-on-Don16 January 1998, Moscow) was an Armenian composer and musicologist. She was born in Rostov-on-Don, Russia, and graduated from the Leningrad Conservatory. She studied composition with K'usnaryan and piano with Moisei Khalfin. In 1947 she took a teaching position with the Yerevan Komitas State Conservatory where she was appointed professor in 1977. She was made an Honored Art Worker of the Armenian SSR in 1965, and published a work on the polyphonic characteristics of Aram Khachaturian in 1969.

Works
Selected works include:
Piano Trio
Suite, for orchestra No. 2
Six Preludes
Polifonicheskii al'bom dlia iunoshestva. 13 fortepiannykh p'es collection, 1975

Her work has been recorded and issued on CD, including:
Armenian Piano Trios, Audio CD (September 20, 2004) Et'Cetera, ASIN: B0006Z2LEC

References

External links
Gayane Chebotaryan - Piano Trio at Youtube
Gayane Chebotaryan - Piano prelude no. 3 on Youtube

1918 births
1998 deaths
Women classical composers
Soviet Armenians
Soviet composers
Musicians from Rostov-on-Don
Saint Petersburg Conservatory alumni
Academic staff of the Komitas State Conservatory of Yerevan
20th-century women composers